Franz Bednar (born 31 March 1910; date of death unknown) is an Austrian bobsledder who competed in the mid-1930s. He finished 13th and last in completing the four runs in the four-man event at the 1936 Winter Olympics in Garmisch-Partenkirchen.

References
1936 bobsleigh four-man results
1936 Olympic Winter Games official report. - p. 415.

1910 births
Austrian male bobsledders
Bobsledders at the 1936 Winter Olympics
Year of death missing
Olympic bobsledders of Austria